

Gustav Schmidt (24 April 1894  – 7 August 1943) was a German general in the Wehrmacht during World War II. He was a recipient of the  Knight's Cross of the Iron Cross with Oak Leaves. Schmidt committed suicide on 7 August 1943 to avoid capture by the Red Army in the course of the Soviet Belgorod-Kharkov Offensive Operation.

Awards 
 Iron Cross (1914) 2nd Class (15 September 1914) & 1st Class (18 October 1915)

 Clasp to the Iron Cross (1939) 2nd Class (21 September 1939) & 1st Class (2 October 1939)
 German Cross in Gold on 22 April 1942 as Oberst in the 19. Schützen-Brigade
 Knight's Cross of the Iron Cross with Oak Leaves
 Knight's Cross on 4 September 1940 as Oberst and commander of Infanterie-Regiment 742
 203rd Oak Leaves on 6 March 1943 as Generalleutnant and commander of 19. Panzer-Division

References

Citations

Bibliography

 
 
 

1894 births
1943 deaths
Lieutenant generals of the German Army (Wehrmacht)
German Army personnel of World War I
Recipients of the Gold German Cross
Recipients of the Knight's Cross of the Iron Cross with Oak Leaves
German military personnel who committed suicide
People from Querfurt
People from the Province of Saxony
Recipients of the clasp to the Iron Cross, 1st class
Suicides in the Soviet Union
Suicides in Russia
Military personnel from Saxony-Anhalt
German Army generals of World War II